Gemma Bonner (born 13 July 1991) is an English professional footballer who plays as a defender for Liverpool, as well as the England women's national football team.

Bonner began her career with her hometown club Leeds United, before spending two seasons with Chelsea. In November 2012, Bonner signed for Liverpool of the FA WSL. She captained Liverpool to the FA WSL titles in 2013 and 2014. Bonner left Liverpool for Manchester City in 2018.

An England international, Bonner made her senior debut in September 2013. She was part of England's squad for the UEFA Women's Euro 2013 but did not play in the final tournament.

Club career

Early career
Bonner started playing football as soon as she could run and by the age of eight had already joined Leeds United.

Leeds United
While at Leeds, the defender won the League Cup in 2010, and was in the runner-up team of the FA Cup in 2008.

Chelsea
Her versatility with both feet and strong aerial ability were the main attributes that brought Chelsea calling in January 2011, when the Blues secured her signature ahead of the Women's Super League.

She played in the first ever FA Cup Final of Chelsea, in 2012. The young defender scored her only goal of the 2011–12 FA Women's Cup in their 2–0 away win against The Belles in the 6th round, helping her side to secure their place in the semi finals. In the penalty shoot-out of the 2012 FA Women's Cup Final, she was unable to convert her penalty into a goal. She blazed hers over the bar to hand the Cup to Birmingham.

Bonner scored her first league goal for Chelsea in the very next game after the 2012 FA Women's Cup Final, against their cup final opponents Birmingham.

Liverpool
In November 2012 Bonner signed for Liverpool. In doing so she linked up with her ex-Chelsea manager Matt Beard and expressed her excitement at the move: "I am delighted to be joining Liverpool at a key time in my football career and have been greatly influenced by the commitment that Liverpool FC are showing towards women's football. When the opportunity to work with Matt again came I was pleased to take it and I am excited for the challenge ahead."

With Bonner as captain Liverpool won the league title in 2013 and 2014 but were much less successful in 2015, finishing second bottom. She extended her contract with the club in November 2015.

Manchester City
Bonner left Liverpool in June 2018 after six years and a total of 115 appearances, to join Manchester City Women. She scored 11 goals in 69 matches with City, though her last season there was cut short by ankle and muscle injuries.

Racing Louisville 
In April 2021, Racing Louisville FC announced signing Bonner to a two-year contract with an option for a third year. She arrived in June and started 13 matches for the expansion club through the 2021 season. Bonner was named one of four captains at Racing for 2022. She has started all four of Racing's 2022 NWSL Challenge Cup matches, scoring in her team's 3-0 win at Kansas City.

Liverpool
On 23 December 2022 Bonner signed with Liverpool again.

International career
An England representative at Under 17s, Under 19s, Under 20s and Under 23s level by the age of 19, Bonner has accumulated a wealth of international experience. She was in the England Under 17s World Cup team, in which they ended in the fourth place. In 2009 Bonner was part of the England Under 19s European Championship winning side.
Bonner received her first senior team call-up for the UEFA Euro 2013 qualifier away to Croatia in March 2012.

Bonner made her first senior appearance in September 2013, under interim coach Brent Hills, in an 8–0 World Cup qualifying win over Turkey at Fratton Park. She was recalled to the team by incoming coach Phil Neville in January 2018, but an ankle ligament injury ruled her out of the 2018 SheBelieves Cup in March.

In February 2019 Bonner was added to the England squad for the SheBelieves Cup following an injury to Millie Bright.

International goals
Scores and results list England's goal tally first.

Honours

Club
Leeds United
 FA Women's Premier League Cup (1): 2010;
Liverpool Ladies
 WSL Women's Super League (2): 2013; 2014
Manchester City
Women's FA Cup: 2019–20

International

England
 SheBelieves Cup: 2019

England U19
 UEFA Women's Under-19 Championship
Winners (1): 2009
Runners-up (1): 2010

Individual 

 Liverpool Women's Fans Player of the Year: 2018

References

External links

 GEMMA BONNER at thefa.com
 GEMMA BONNER at chelseafc.com
 
 Profile at Manchester City F.C.

English women's footballers
Chelsea F.C. Women players
Leeds United Women F.C. players
Liverpool F.C. Women players
Manchester City W.F.C. players
England women's international footballers
England women's under-23 international footballers
1989 births
Living people
Women's Super League players
FA Women's National League players
Footballers from Leeds
Women's association football defenders
National Women's Soccer League players
Racing Louisville FC players